CCT p/b Champion System was a New Zealand UCI Continental cycling team that existed in 2015. The team raced both road and cyclo-cross races.

Team roster

Major wins
Sources:
2015
  National Time Trial Championships, Michael Vink
 Greymouth Around Brunner Ride, Michael Vink
 Asian Cycling Championships U23 Road Race, Yuma Koishi
  National U23 Time Trial Championships, Yuma Koishi
 Beromünster, Sascha Weber
 Madiswil, Sascha Weber
 Iowa I, Jonathan Page

References

UCI Continental Teams (Oceania)
Cycling teams established in 2015
Cycling teams based in New Zealand
2015 establishments in New Zealand